Waipapakauri is a small settlement in the Far North District of New Zealand. It is located on State Highway 1 at the isthmus of the Aupouri Peninsula. The larger settlement of Awanui lies to the southeast. Waipapakauri is some 12 kilometres to the north of Kaitaia, the nearest town.

The small Waipapakauri Creek crosses SH1 just to the east, flowing north to reach the broad mudflats of Rangaunu Harbour. Several small lakes lie to the southwest of the settlement, the largest of them being Lake Ngatu. Waipapakauri is located close to Ninety Mile Beach and has long beek known for shellfish harvesting. Flax milling was also formerly carried out at Waipapakauri. The settlement was the site of an airforce base, RNZAF Station Waipapakauri, during World War II.

The name Waipapakauri is Māori for "Swamp where the kauri grow".

Noted people connected with Waipapakauri include former All Blacks Percy Erceg (who was born in the settlement), Peter Jones (who spent his last years there), former MP John Carter is a resident of Waipapakauri and Edward Te Whiu, 82nd person to be judicially executed in New Zealand.

History

Waipapakauri was an important location for the late 19th/early 20th century kauri gum digging trade. In the 1910s, the lower quality chip gum found at the southern half of the Aupouri Peninsula greatly increased in value.

Demographics
The SA1 area is part of the larger Rangaunu Harbour statistical area.

7000024 had a population of 186 at the 2018 New Zealand census, an increase of 18 people (10.7%) since the 2013 census, and an increase of 18 people (10.7%) since the 2006 census. There were 57 households, comprising 96 males and 90 females, giving a sex ratio of 1.07 males per female. The median age was 35.4 years (compared with 37.4 years nationally), with 42 people (22.6%) aged under 15 years, 39 (21.0%) aged 15 to 29, 75 (40.3%) aged 30 to 64, and 27 (14.5%) aged 65 or older.

Ethnicities were 61.3% European/Pākehā, 69.4% Māori, 3.2% Pacific peoples, and 8.1% Asian. People may identify with more than one ethnicity.

Of those people who chose to answer the census's question about religious affiliation, 53.2% had no religion, 29.0% were Christian, 1.6% were Buddhist and 6.5% had Māori religious beliefs.

Of those at least 15 years old, 9 (6.2%) people had a bachelor or higher degree, and 42 (29.2%) people had no formal qualifications. The median income was $22,800, compared with $31,800 nationally. 6 people (4.2%) earned over $70,000 compared to 17.2% nationally. The employment status of those at least 15 was that 69 (47.9%) people were employed full-time, 18 (12.5%) were part-time, and 15 (10.4%) were unemployed.

References

Populated places in the Northland Region
Far North District